Neochrysops is a genus of horse flies in the family Tabanidae.

Distribution
United States.

Species
Neochrysops globosus Walton, 1918

References

Brachycera genera
Tabanidae
Diptera of North America